Sajlovo or Donje Sajlovo is a neighborhood of the city of Novi Sad, Serbia.

History
In 1237, two villages with name Sajlovo (Hungarian: Zajol), Donje Sajlovo and Gornje Sajlovo, were mentioned to exist in this area. The original name of these settlements was Isailovo. Settlements were named after monk Isaija from nearby monastery that existed in the 12th century in the east of Rumenka. Name Sajlovo/Isailovo is of Slavic origin, which indicate that these settlements were initially inhabited by Slavs.

Modern settlement of Sajlovo was mostly settled during the 1990s with Serb refugees from parts of former Yugoslavia.

Borders

The north-eastern border of Sajlovo is Rumenački put (Rumenka Road), the south-eastern border is ulica Donje Sajlovo (Donje Sajlovo Street), and the western border is a western city limit of Novi Sad.

Neighbouring city quarters
The neighbouring city quarters are Jugovićevo in the south-east, and Industrijska Zona Jug in the north-east.

Gallery

See also
 Neighborhoods of Novi Sad

References

Branko Ćurčin, Slana Bara nekad i sad, Novi Sad, 2002.
Jovan Mirosavljević, Brevijar ulica Novog Sada 1745-2001, Novi Sad, 2002.
Zoran Rapajić, Novi Sad bez tajni, Beograd, 2002.

External links 

Sajlovo images
Brujalo celo Sajlovo (in Serbian)
Sajlovo 1940 (in Serbian)
Detailed map of Novi Sad and Sajlovo

Novi Sad neighborhoods